Box Car Racer is the only studio album by American rock band of the same name. Produced by Jerry Finn, the album was released May 21, 2002, through MCA Records. The band was a side-project of Blink-182 members Tom DeLonge and Travis Barker, with David Kennedy completing the band's studio lineup; a bassist and friend of Barker, Anthony Celestino, toured with the band throughout late 2002.

The record is primarily based on DeLonge's post-hardcore influences, such as Fugazi and Refused. The recording sessions were particularly difficult for him, as he had recently undergone back surgery. The record is a concept album detailing the end of the world, and features dark, moody tracks mulling over confusion. Blink-182 bassist Mark Hoppus—the only member of that band not involved in the project—felt betrayed over his lack of inclusion, which evolved into tensions between him and DeLonge, which contributed to the band's 2005 breakup. Despite this, Hoppus provided guest vocals on the album's twelfth track "Elevator".

Box Car Racer peaked at number twelve on the US Billboard 200 despite little promotion, and the two singles "I Feel So" and "There Is" charted on Billboard Modern Rock Tracks chart, with the former hitting the top 10. The album received positive reviews from music critics, who complimented the darker direction in comparison to DeLonge's previous work with Blink. The group toured the album in North America in late 2002 with the Used and H2O and subsequently dissolved in 2003 before DeLonge and Barker revived the group in 2021 for a track that was later reworked as a Blink-182 track.

Background

Box Car Racer was conceived by Blink-182 guitarist/vocalist Tom DeLonge and formed during a break from touring. The trio's European tour in the winter of 2001 was delayed in the aftermath of the September 11 attacks, and rescheduled dates in early 2002 were also canceled due to DeLonge's back problems, the result of a herniated disc. He began taking painkillers and developed "neurosis-inducing side effects." DeLonge had felt "bummed out" and creatively stifled while recording the group's previous album, Take Off Your Pants and Jacket. On the ensuing tour, he and Blink drummer Travis Barker would jam "every day," and Barker introduced him to post-hardcore music.  DeLonge had previously been derisive of any other styles of music, but soon embraced acts like Fugazi, Quicksand, Rocket from the Crypt, and Pitchfork. He began writing heavier-sounding guitar riffs; the first riff he created became part of the song "All Systems Go". Barker, in his 2015 memoir Can I Say, maintains that he asked DeLonge if they should use the riffs for a new Blink album. "I honestly thought that Tom had already had a conversation with [bassist Mark Hoppus] about this. They were so tight—inseparable—I couldn't imagine Mark didn't know," Barker writes.

For DeLonge, he had developed an "itch to do something where he didn't feel locked in to what Blink was." According to DeLonge, Box Car Racer was not "meant to be a real band," but rather "something to do in some spare time that was really only expected to be on the low list of the totem pole of priorities in my life, and just to have an experimental creative outlet." The project was at first solely acoustic guitar-based; he considered it in its earliest stages to be a "Violent Femmes-esque acoustic record". The unnamed project went through other names, such as The Kill, and the album was initially titled Et tu, Brute?. He eventually settled on the name Box Car Racer, which was actually the name of a band Barker was in just after high school that DeLonge liked. He began writing songs about the end of the world, and connected it thematically with the biblical Book of Revelation and World War II. When reading about the war, DeLonge was "freaked out" to learn that Fat Man, the atomic bomb that was detonated over Nagasaki, was dropped from the B-29 bomber Bockscar (commonly misspelled Boxcar).

Recording and production

Box Car Racer was recorded over six weeks beginning in December 2001, primarily at Signature Sound in San Diego, California. Sessions commenced quickly, with producer Jerry Finn having sent one whole load of equipment to Signature ahead of his arrival. Barker and DeLonge worked out "80 percent" of the completed album in Barker's warehouse in Corona, California, two weeks prior to recording. When the musicians entered the studio, little was changed aside from certain lyrics, according to assistant engineer Sam Boukas. Barker completed his drum tracks in one day at two recording facilities in Los Angeles prior to the Signature sessions. DeLonge invited musician David Kennedy, whom he had met in the San Diego music circuit some years prior, to perform lead guitar parts on the album. Roger Joseph Manning Jr. plays keyboards on the record.

The sessions were particularly difficult for DeLonge, who suffered chronic back pain. "When your back is killing you and you have to have surgery and all this stuff, it's just kind of hard to keep a focus on the happier times in your life," he told MTV News. "You end up writing all these songs about feeling sad and confused." He often could only stand and sing for five minutes at a time before having to lay down again. Journalist Joe Shooman writes that the album followed a DIY spirit, rather than spending "months and months refining and polishing everything for a major label and international pop market." DeLonge intended to pay for the project himself, but when an A&R representative heard four unfinished songs, MCA—the record label Blink-182 was on—wanted to finance the album. DeLonge's manager convinced him it would be a bad idea to pass up someone else paying for its distribution. According to Boukas, an MCA representative dropped in on the sessions and was pleased with what he heard. "When we wrote this album, we didn't know if it was going to be on a label or if we were going to put it out ourselves," Barker said at the time. "Once MCA jumped on board, it was kind of like, "Whatever! That's cool. Cheers! Put it out, we don't really care!"

The project caused division in Blink-182, mostly between DeLonge and Hoppus. Hoppus was interested in being a part of the record, but DeLonge did not want it to turn into a Blink-182 album. DeLonge contended that the involvement of Barker was to refrain from having to pay a session musician. Regardless, Hoppus felt betrayed and unresolved tension dogged the band until their 2005 breakup. "Nobody talked about it. It was this strange situation that nobody addressed," DeLonge told Blender. Barker felt guilty when he told Hoppus they were going to tour in support of the album: "I felt like I had let him down [...] but he was ultimately more upset at Tom because they had ten years of history together before me." Despite this tension, Hoppus lent vocals to the track "Elevator" and shared early ideas for the next Blink-182 album. In a later Reddit AMA, Hoppus concluded, "The whole situation sucked. But I sang on the track because, at the heart of it, Tom and Travis are my friends. I'm sure Tom felt the tension and asked me as an offering. I was glad to have done it, and I was glad that he asked."

Composition and artwork

Box Car Racer was inspired by and is partly a tribute to bands DeLonge credited as an influence, such as Quicksand, Fugazi, and Refused. Musically, it is not drastically different than Blink-182, though it puts more emphasis on "slower, heavier rhythms" instead of being fast-paced. Critics primarily labeled the album as pop punk, but with a few other genre categories being ascribed to the album. PopMatters describing the album as a "hardcore/emo/punk rock album" while also describing it as a pop punk album. USA Today labeled the album as power pop. The subject matter found on Box Car Racer explores the apocalypse, conspiracy theories, and Freemasonry. The album follows a central storyline, regarding an unnamed boy during the end of the world.

Barker and DeLonge wrote the songs together. DeLonge would decide what key he would sing the song in, and Barker would mostly arrange the song, toying with its structure and tempo/time signature. As for his performance on the album, Barker considered it a "totally different approach to the drums ... there are, like, jazzy bridges. ... It's so much more open and roomy." The album's final song, "Instrumental", was removed on the cassette edition of the album and replaced with an instrumental version of "I Feel So". The album's artwork, described by Shooman, consists of "bleak burgundy brown and black silhouettes plus a graffiti-esque band logo." The hidden message "LNW 13 01 1" is printed on the CD insert, which are coordinates pointing to Manhattan, New York. Art direction for the album was headed by Tim Stedman, with Stedman and Marcos Orozco designing the package. Keegan Gibbs was responsible for the "Box Car Racer" logo, while Maxx Gramajo created the tag logo artwork. Scott Heisel of Punknews.org considered the album similar to Blink-182, describing it as "Blink 182 in drop D tuning".

Critical reception

Aaron Scott of Slant was favorable in his review of Box Car Racer, writing, "Neither genre-obsessed nor intent on defying convention, Box Car Racer is the perfect union between pop-punk riffs and instrumentation that spans all rock genres from indie to folk. Finally, we have a pop band that is attempting to take advantage of the potential of its instruments." Adam Dlugacz of PopMatters summarized Box Car Racer as "pretty fantastic hardcore/emo/punk rock album. It seems to re-affirm the band's roots while proving that they are capable of more than the by-the-numbers approach of Blink. On the other hand, there's no reason this couldn't have been a Blink-182 album." Robert Morast from Argus Leader felt the same, commenting, "The music is good with brooding melodies that fester inside the soul. But for DeLonge, it just sounds like he's lost searching for his other half."

Edna Gunderson of USA Today was positive, commenting, "The music, while upbeat and even giddy, steers away from adolescent pranks and pratfalls, a welcome upgrade. The band creates a fresh breed of post-punk power pop by roughing up bright melodies." AllMusic's Brian O'Neill gave the album three stars, calling it a "far cry from the party-boy ethos DeLonge is best known for, and he wears the emotional depth well, with songs that are just as hooky as from his bread-winning main squeeze." A reviewer for Q admitted that the musicians "confound expectations with a very good record." The positive reception of the album was in contrast to the reviews for Blink, which were often negative. "I think it's a cop-out for [critics] to like the music I do," DeLonge told the Arizona Daily Star. "Critics can't say they like Blink or give us any credit, 'cause we're out there goofing around." Barker was more critical: "I especially don't care what the critics say. Most of them are like 50 years old and they're not really educated in what kind of music we're playing to begin with!" Scott Heisel of Punknews.org denounced the album as "completely and utterly forgettable".

Commercial performance
Box Car Racer was released worldwide on May 21, 2002, by MCA Records. The album debuted on the Billboard 200 at number 12 on May 30, 2002, selling 65,000 copies in its first week. The numbers were considered surprising given that the album had virtually no promotion. "The overall response to this album has been ridiculous. We didn't have much push or anything, we didn't do a whole lot of promo before the album came out and it still did really well," said Barker. As of August 2002, it had sold 244,000 copies in the U.S., according to Nielsen SoundScan. Internationally, the album charted best in Canada, where it peaked at number seven. In 2006, the album was certified gold in Canada for shipments of 50,000 copies.

"I Feel So" was the album's first single. The music video for the song, which is mainly performance-based, was co-directed by DeLonge and Nathan "Karma" Cox. The song was the band's highest-charting single, peaking at number eight on Billboard Modern Rock Tracks chart in June 2002. "There Is" was issued as the album's second and final single, and peaked at number 32 on the same chart in November 2002. The music video for that song was inspired by the film Say Anything... (1989), and was directed by Alexander Kosta. Both videos, as well as bonus footage, were included on a self-titled DVD, which was released November 2002.

Touring

To support the album, the project morphed into a full band, with Barker, DeLonge, and Kennedy. Barker invited his friend Anthony Celestino to play bass. He had initially wanted Alex Barreto, who was in the original Box Car Racer, to be a part of the "second version" of the band, but he could not get in touch with him. They played their first four shows in April 2002. The group commenced a full-scale tour behind the album in October 2002, with 22 North American shows supported by the Used and H2O.

Though DeLonge would joke around at shows, as he was known for doing with Blink-182, the overall mood was much different. "With Blink, I can't wait until I get done playing a song so I can say something stupid. With this band I hardly talk at all," he told Las Vegas Weekly. He expounded upon this in another interview: "It's a much more powerful, emotional experience than it is with Blink. To play songs and have them showcased to where it represents what this kind of music is all about is a welcome experience. It's not about anything but the music itself."

Aftermath
In a 2003 interview with Kerrang!, DeLonge claimed the album was only an attempt to "challenge myself to do different shit": "I did it for myself, whether it sold a million copies or just one, it was for myself." He clarified the band's future succinctly: "There are a lot of emotions between Mark and I and that's why there's never going to be another Box Car Racer album. It was never meant to be something that would alienate anybody." The article's author, Tom Bryant, describes the album's effect on subsequent Blink-182 albums: "It allowed [DeLonge], and therefore the band, to assess whether, approaching or in their 30s, they still really wanted to be writing songs about splitting up from teenage sweethearts or whether it was time to address something a little more serious and a little more important."

Track listing

Personnel
Information adapted from CD liner notes.

Box Car Racer
Tom DeLonge – vocals, guitars, bass guitar
David Kennedy – guitars
Travis Barker – drums, percussion

Production
Jerry Finn – producer
Rich Costey – mixing
Joe McGrath – engineering
Brian Gardner – mastering
Darren Mora – assistant engineer
Jeff Moses – assistant engineer
Sam Boukas – assistant engineer
Mike Fasano – drum technician

Management
Rick DeVoe – management
Gary Ashley – A&R

Artwork
Tim Stedman – art direction, illustration, photography
Marcos Orozco – illustration, photography
Maxx Gramajo – tag logo artwork
Keegan Gibbs – "Box Car Racer" logo

Additional musicians
Roger Joseph Manning Jr. – keyboards
Mark Hoppus – featured vocals on "Elevator"
Tim Armstrong – featured vocals on "Cat Like Thief"
Jordan Pundik – backing vocals on "Cat Like Thief"

Charts

Weekly charts

Year-end charts

Certifications

References

External links

Box Car Racer  at YouTube (streamed copy where licensed)

2002 debut albums
MCA Records albums
Box Car Racer albums
Concept albums
Albums produced by Jerry Finn